Mumiola spirata is a species of sea snail, a marine gastropod mollusk in the family Pyramidellidae, the pyrams and their allies.

Description
The white shell is covered under a yellowish or brownish epidermis. Its length measures 7 mm.  It is longitudinally plicate and transversely grooved. The sutures are channeled. The teleoconch contains eight gradate whorls. The columella has an oblique fold.

Distribution
This species occurs in the Pacific Ocean off the Philippines and Japan.

References

 Trew, A. (1992). Henry and Arthur Adams's new molluscan names. Cardiff : National Museum of Wales. 63 pp.
 Higo, S., Callomon, P. & Goto, Y. (1999). Catalogue and bibliography of the marine shell-bearing Mollusca of Japan. Osaka. : Elle Scientific Publications. 749 pp

External links
 To World Register of Marine Species

Pyramidellidae
Gastropods described in 1853